Sabino Anastacio is a Palauan politician who has been speaker of the House of Delegates of Palau since January 2013.

Political career 
He was part of a delegation to Taiwan in 2017.

References 

Living people
Year of birth missing (living people)
Place of birth missing (living people)
Speakers of the House of Delegates of Palau

21st-century Palauan politicians